"Mel Made Me Do It" is a song by English rapper Stormzy, released as a single on 23 September 2022 through 0207 Def Jam and #Merky. It contains guest appearances from Jamaican musician Stylo G and English actress Michaela Coel. The song, Stormzy's longest at the time, was written by him and producer Knox Brown. It was released alongside its 11-minute music video, which includes a variety of cameo appearances from Usain Bolt and Louis Theroux amongst others.

Content
The song includes a guest appearance by Stylo G and a monologue performed by Michaela Coel that was written by Wretch 32. It is named for Stormzy's personal stylist Melissa's Wardrobe and her "direct influence" on him.

Critical reception

Will Pritchard of The Guardian felt the track contains "boastful, whip-smart wordplay" and "slot[s] somewhere in the chasm" between Stormzy's modes of "choral, heaving and heartfelt" and "puff-chested flexing", ultimately describing it as a "testament to Stormzy's magnetism". Ellie Robinson of NME wrote that the song "stands out with its minimalistic, progressive instrumental, buzzing along with sharp 808 beats and modulated string-work" accompanying "Stormzy's vicious flow".

Music video
The song's music video, released alongside the song, was directed by KLVDR and includes cameo appearances from Usain Bolt, Jonathan Ross, Louis Theroux, José Mourinho, Dave, Little Simz,  Dina Asher-Smith, Headie One, Gabrielle, Ian Wright, Brenda Edwards, Stylo G, Trevor Nelson, Jme, Julie Adenuga, Walé Adeyemi and Stormzy's family, among others.

Charts

References

2022 singles
2022 songs
Songs written by Stormzy
Stormzy songs